Resulaj shooting is a mass shooting that occurred on 10 August 2018, at Resulaj, Selenicë, Vlorë County, Albania. Ritvan Zykaj shot 8 of his relatives using a Kalashnikov. After the shooting, he hid on a hill near the village and was caught by police the next day.

Shooting
At around 1:30 p.m. on 10 August 2018, the Zykaj family gathered for lunch with Kujtim Zykaj. During lunch, it was discussed that Ritvan Zykaj stole chickens from Vasilika Zykaj. Offended and annoyed, he got up from dinner and left. Thirty minutes later, he returned with a Kalashnikov rifle and shot eight people. He filmed the bodies of the victims and sent the video to a relative via Facebook Messenger. After the shooting, he fled and hid on a hill. While in hiding, he wrote comments on Facebook. He was detained the next day.

Victims
8 people died in the attack:

 Demir Zykaj (75) brother of the attacker's grandfather.

 Perrie Zykaj (78) Demir Zykaj wife.

 Besim Zykaj (42) son of Demir and Perrie Zykaj.

 Vasilika Zykaj (40) wife of Besim Zykaj.

 Sara Zykaj (15) daughter of Besim Zykaj.

 Ledjon Zykaj (8) son of Besim Zykaj.

 Azem Zykaj (49) son of Demir and Perrie Zykaj.

 Afërdita Zykaj (47) wife of Azem Zykaj.

Perpetrator
Ritvan Zykaj was born on 16 June 1994 in Selenicë. He lived in the village of Resulaj.

Eight years before the shooting, Ritvan was badly burned in a fire. Two of the victims, Besim and Azem Zykaj, rescued him then. Due to this fire, his behavior became inadequate and strange. He became nervous. He has been repeatedly accused of theft. He was arrested for this, investigated, but released. He also repeatedly fired near the village. Residents complained to the police, Ritvan was arrested but released.

The forensic examination concluded that he was mentally healthy.

According to him, the Kalashnikov assault rifle, which was used in the shooting, was obtained during the Albanian Civil War and has been stored ever since.

On 10 July 2019, he was sentenced to life imprisonment.

References

2018 mass shootings in Europe
Filmed killings
Familicides
Mass shootings in Albania
Mass murder in 2018